Chooser can refer to:

 Choosing, to select freely and after consideration.
 A user interface on a computer that allows the user to choose items from large collections of data.
 Apple Chooser, an application for Macintosh systems.
 Spectasia 3D Chooser, an application for Windows and Macintosh systems.

nl:Chooser